Noah Alexandersson (born 30 September 2001) is a Swedish footballer who plays for Moss FK as a midfielder. He is the son of Niclas Alexandersson.

References

External links 
 

2001 births
Living people
Swedish footballers
Sweden youth international footballers
Allsvenskan players
Norwegian Second Division players
Västra Frölunda IF players
IFK Göteborg players
Moss FK players
Association football midfielders
Swedish expatriate footballers
Expatriate footballers in Norway
Swedish expatriate sportspeople in Norway